Ebrahim Sami (also Romanized as Ebrāhīm Samī‘; also known as Ebrāhīm Sham‘alī, Ibragim-Sami, and Ibrāhīmsāmi) is a village in Minjavan-e Gharbi Rural District, Minjavan District, Khoda Afarin County, East Azerbaijan Province, Iran. At the 2006 census, its population was 434, in 87 families.

References 

Populated places in Khoda Afarin County